Ticker can mean:

 Ticker tape, the paper strip output by a stock ticker machine
 Ticker symbol, codes used to uniquely identify publicly traded companies on a stock market
 News ticker, a small screen space on television news dedicated to headlines or minor pieces of news
 Ticker (2001 film), an action film directed by Albert Pyun
 Ticker (2008 film), an action/comedy film written by Stephen Langford & Shin Koyamada
 Heart, informally
 A rich media self-updating graphic added to the signature of an online chat profile that serves as a countdown to an important event

See also
Tikka (disambiguation)